Hui Xiong is a data scientist. He is a Distinguished Professor at Rutgers University and a Distinguished Guest Professor (Grand Master Chair Professor) at the University of Science and Technology of China (USTC).

Education
Xiong received his B.E. degree in Automation from the University of Science and Technology of China and his M.S. degree in Computer Science from the National University of Singapore. He received his Ph.D. in Computer Science with a minor in Statistics from the University of Minnesota - Twin Cities in 2005 under Vipin Kumar.

Career
Xiong became an Assistant Professor in the Management Science and Information Systems Department of Rutgers Business School - Newark and New Brunswick in 2005. He became an Associate Professor in the same place in 2009. In 2014, he became a full professor in the same place in 2014. He became a Rutgers Business School Dean's Research Professor in 2016.  Now he is a Distinguished Professor in the same place starting from 2021.

Xiong served as Deputy Dean of Baidu Research Institute  and the Founding Head of Business Intelligence Lab as well as the Founding Head of Talent Intelligence Center of Baidu Inc. while on leave from Rutgers University.

Professional Service
Xiong serves as a co-Editor-in-Chief of Encyclopedia of GIS. In addition, he is an Associate Editor of IEEE Transactions on Big Data (TBD), ACM Transactions on Knowledge Discovery from Data (TKDD) and ACM Transactions on Management Information Systems (TMIS). In 2018, Xiong served as a PC Chair of the Research Track for the ACM Special Interest Group on Knowledge Discovery and Data Mining (SIGKDD). In 2013 and 2015, he as a General Chair of the IEEE International Conference on Data Mining (ICDM). He also served as an Industry and Government Track Co-Chair of the 18th ACM Special Interest Group on Knowledge Discovery and Data Mining (SIGKDD) in 2012

Books
 "Encyclopedia of GIS" 
 "Hyperclique pattern discovery: Algorithms and applications"
 "Clustering and Information Retrieval"

Media Highlights
 "The Economist, Crime prevention Cutpurse capers"
 "The Ethics Of Big Data"
 "Dr Hui Xiong – Harnessing Big Data to Identify Ideal Locations for Warehouses and Bike Share Stations"

Selected honors and distinctions
Distinguished Professor with tenure, Rutgers University, 2021.
AAAI 2021 Best Paper Award, 2021
AAAS Fellow, 2020
IEEE Fellow, 2020
The Ram Charan Management Practice Award as the Grand Prix winner, the Harvard Business Review, 2018
RBS Dean’s Research Professor, 2016
IEEE ICDM Outstanding Service Award, 2017.
ACM Distinguished Member, 2014
Dean’s Award for Meritorious Research, Rutgers Business School, 2010, 2011, 2013, 2015.
2011 IEEE ICDM Best Research Paper Award for the paper ”Personalized Travel Package Recommendation”, published at IEEE International Conference on Data Mining (one out of 786 submissions), 2011.
Second Prize of Unsupervised and Transfer Learning Challenge, ICML and IJCNN, 2011.
Rutgers University Board of Trustees Research Fellowship for Scholarly Excellence, 2009.
IBM ESA Innovation Award, 2008.

Graduated Ph.D. Students
Dr. Xiong is also an outstanding mentor who has an extraordinary record of producing Ph.D. students who have gone on to become faculty in major academic institutions. In particular, 11 out of 17 his Ph.D. graduates have become tenure-track professors in major research universities, such as the University of Arizona, Stony Brook University, George Mason University, University of Central Florida, the City University of Hong Kong, ESCP - Paris, University of Kansas and the University of Tennessee, Knoxville.

References

External links

1972 births
Living people
Fellow Members of the IEEE
Chinese computer scientists
Scientists from Jiangxi
Chinese expatriates in the United States
University of Science and Technology of China alumni
National University of Singapore alumni
University of Minnesota College of Science and Engineering alumni
Rutgers University faculty
Baidu people